Mike & Brenda Sutton was an American musical duo composed of Michael B. Sutton and Brenda Sutton. The duo are best known for both their songwriting-production work at Motown and their own recordings in the early 1980s, including the dance song "Don't Let Go of Me (Grip My Hips and Move Me)" as remixed by Shep Pettibone.

Discovered by Stevie Wonder, both became writers and producers at Motown Records, working there from 1974 to 1979. The duo produced numerous hits at the label, most notably "There Will Come A Day" by Smokey Robinson, "Stay With Me" by Jermaine Jackson, as well as songs by the group Switch. They are the recipients of one Gold and two Platinum albums for their work.

After leaving Motown they partnered with long-time friend Cheryl Lynn and wrote the Ray Parker-produced Top 5 R&B hit "Shake It Up Tonight". The Suttons also recorded two albums of their own, Don't Hold Back in 1982, and So Good in 1984, scoring several R&B and dance hits. They later worked with Ian Levine for his Motown revival project and recorded the track "No Other Love".

History
Back in the early 1970s, Michael B. Sutton wrote numerous songs for Motown artists including Thelma Houston, Smokey Robinson, Jermaine Jackson, Michael Jackson, The Supremes.

Michael Sutton and Brenda Sutton were originally members of a disco/R&B group called Finished Touch. Together with Finished Touch they recorded a few songs for legendary Motown label including dancefloor favorites like "Need to Know You (Better)" and "I Love To See You Dance". After the band broke up in 1979 they signed to Sam Records and recorded soul-tinged boogie-funk songs "Don't Let Go of Me" and "We'll Make It". Both songs entered the Billboard Club Play Singles chart, reaching No. 37 ("Don't Let Go of Me") and No. 49 ("We'll Make It").

Discography

Studio albums

Singles

References

American dance music groups
American soul musical groups
American musical duos
Sutton
SAM Records artists
Virgin Records artists
American boogie musicians
Musical groups established in 1981
Musical groups disestablished in 1984